KRE may mean:

 1400 KVTO, an AM radio station, Berkeley, California, US, call sign KRE 1922-1986
 102.9 KBLX-FM, an FM radio station, Berkeley, California, US, call sign KRE-FM 1949-1979
 Kirundo Airport, Burundi, IATA airport code
 North Korea, ITU country code